Borophagus parvus is an extinct species of the genus Borophagus, of the subfamily Borophaginae, a group of canids endemic to North America from the late Hemphillian of the Miocene epoch through the Pliocene epoch 10.3—4.9 Ma, existing for approximately .

Overview
Borophagus, like other Borophaginae, are loosely known as "bone-crushing" or "hyena-like" dogs.  Though not the most massive borophagine by size or weight, it had a more highly evolved capacity to crunch bone than earlier, larger genera such as Epicyon, which seems to be an evolutionary trend of the group (Turner, 2004). During the Pliocene epoch, Borophagus began being displaced by Canis genera such as Canis edwardii and later by Canis dirus. Early species of Borophagus were placed in the genus Osteoborus until recently, but the genera are now considered synonyms. Borophagus parvus possibly led a hyena-like lifestyle scavenging carcasses of recently dead animals.

Taxonomy
Paracynarctus was named by Wang et al. (1999). Its type is Paracynarctus sinclairi. It was assigned to Cynarctina by Wang et al. (1999).

Morphology
Typical features of this genus are a bulging forehead and powerful jaws; it was probably a scavenger. Its crushing premolar teeth and strong jaw muscles would have been used to crack open bone, much like the hyena of the Old World.

References 

Alan Turner, "National Geographic:  Prehistoric Mammals" (Washington, D.C.:  Firecrest Books Ltd., 2004), pp. 112–114.  
Xiaoming Wang, "The Origin and Evolution of the Dog Family"  Accessed 1/30/06.

Further reading
Picture of an Osteoborus skull in a museum, from "World of the Wolf."  (Accessed 6/19/06)
Russell Hunt, "Ecological Polarities Of the North American Family Canidae: A New Approach to Understanding Forty Million Years of Canid Evolution" (Accessed 1/30/06).
Wang et al., "Phylogenetic Systematics of the Borophaginae (Carnivora:Canidae)."  Bulletin of the American Museum of Natural History, No. 243, Nov. 17 1999. (PDF) (Accessed 4/11/06)

Borophagines
Miocene canids
Pliocene carnivorans
Pliocene extinctions
Prehistoric mammals of North America